The 1960 New Hampshire Wildcats football team was an American football team that represented the University of New Hampshire as a member of the Yankee Conference during the 1960 NCAA College Division football season. In its 12th year under head coach Chief Boston, the team compiled a 4–3 record (2–2 against conference opponents) and finished fourth out of six teams in the Yankee Conference.

Schedule

References

New Hampshire
New Hampshire Wildcats football seasons
New Hampshire Wildcats football